Rice Township may refer to:

 Rice Township, Jo Daviess County, Illinois
 Rice Township, Ringgold County, Iowa
 Rice Township, Clearwater County, Minnesota
 Rice Township, Sandusky County, Ohio
 Rice Township, Luzerne County, Pennsylvania

Township name disambiguation pages